Derek Nikitas is the Edgar Award nominated author of Pyres and The Long Division. His short fiction has appeared in Ellery Queen Mystery Magazine, The Ontario Review, Chelsea and New South.

Background
Nikitas was raised in Manchester, New Hampshire and Fairport, New York. He received a B.A. in English from the State University of New York College at Brockport, an M.F.A. in fiction writing from the University of North Carolina at Wilmington, and a PhD from Georgia State University. His first novel, Pyres, was nominated for an Edgar Award for Best First Novel, and his story Wonder was nominated for a Pushcart Prize by Joyce Carol Oates. Nikitas' second novel, The Long Division, was published by Minotaur Books in October, 2009. His science fiction novel for Young Adults, Extra Life, was published by Polis Books in 2015. He has also co-written two "Bookshots" novellas with James Patterson, Diary of a Succubus (2017) and You've Been Warned -- Again (2017). Nikitas' work has been translated into several languages including Japanese, Italian, French, and German. The German translation, Scheiterhaufen, was selected as 'Crime Novel of the Month' by Radio House Europe. Nikitas currently teaches English and Creative Writing at the University of Rhode Island. Previously, he taught in, and directed, the low-residency M.F.A. in creative writing program at Eastern Kentucky University, Bluegrass Writers Studio.

External links 
 https://web.archive.org/web/20110203034026/http://www.dereknikitas.com/author.html

American short story writers
State University of New York at Brockport alumni
University of North Carolina at Wilmington alumni
Living people
Year of birth missing (living people)